The 2018 European Aquatics Championships took place in Glasgow, Edinburgh and Luss in the central belt of Scotland, from 3 to 12 August 2018.

The championships were part of the first European Championships with other events happening in Scotland and Berlin.

Venue
The Tollcross International Swimming Centre hosted the swimming events with the diving being hosted by the Royal Commonwealth Pool in Edinburgh. The open water swimming competition took place at Loch Lomond, while Scotstoun Sports Campus hosted the synchronised swimming events.

Schedule
Competition dates by discipline were:

 Swimming: 3–9 August
 Diving: 6–12 August
 Open water swimming: 8–12 August
 Synchro: 3–7 August

Overall medal table

Swimming

Medal table

Men

 Swimmers who participated in the heats only and received medals.

Women

 Swimmers who participated in the heats only and received medals.

Mixed events

 Swimmers who participated in the heats only and received medals.

Diving

Medal table

Men

Women

Mixed events

Open water swimming

Medal table

Men

Women

Mixed events

Synchronised swimming

Medal table

Results

See also
 2017 World Aquatics Championships
 2019 World Aquatics Championships

References

External links

 Results book − Swimming 
 Results book − Diving 
 Results book − Synchronised swimming 
 Results book − Open water swimming 

 
2018
European Championships
2018 in Scottish sport
Swimming in Scotland
International sports competitions in Glasgow
International aquatics competitions hosted by the United Kingdom
European Aquatics Championships
International sports competitions in Edinburgh
Sport in Argyll and Bute
Diving in Scotland
Open water swimming competitions
aquatics
2010s in Edinburgh
2010s in Glasgow